Chrysochampsa is an extinct monospecific genus of alligatorine. Fossils have been found from the Golden Valley Formation of North Dakota and date back to the Wasatchian regional North American faunal stage of the early Eocene. The genus has been proposed to be synonymous with Allognathosuchus at times, but it is now generally accepted that Chrysochampsa is distinct from all other alligatoroids and is its own taxon.

References

External links
Chrysochampsa in the Paleobiology Database

Alligatoridae
Eocene crocodylomorphs
Eocene reptiles of North America
Prehistoric pseudosuchian genera
Fossil taxa described in 1988